Gilmore Avenue is a main road and suburban distributor in Kwinana south of Perth, and runs through or alongside the suburbs of Medina, Orelia, Calista and Leda, linking them to the Kwinana Freeway via Thomas Road and also to Kwinana Hub Shopping Centre.

In 1999 it was extended to Mandurah Road through the Leda Nature Reserve. It continues as Dixon Road into Rockingham.

The northern section services the town of Centre of Kwinana.

A $4 million project to upgrade the road to a dual carriageway, between Runnymede Gate and Mandurah Road, began in September 2014. Completion is expected in March 2015.

Major intersections

 Summerton Road/Sulphur Road
 Challenger Avenue - to Parmelia
 Wellard Road

See also

References

Roads in Perth, Western Australia